This is Really Something is a greatest hits album by Australian rock and pop band The Sports, released in August 1997.
The album was re-released in August 2004 under the title The Definitive Collection.

Background and release
The Sports formed in 1976 and were signed to Mushroom Records in 1977. Their first Australian hit was "Boys! (What Did the Detective Say?)" in 1978 but they cracked the UK chart with "Who Listens to the Radio" in 1979. They broke up in 1981 after just four albums, three of which peaked within the top 20 in Australia.

Reception

Bernard Zuel of Sydney Morning Herald believes if The Sports had been English they would have been huge. saying ""Boys! (What Did the Detective Say?)" and "Who Listens to the Radio" are classic new wave moments" adding "it's in the collection of could-have-been/should-have-been hits from 1979-81 that this compilation provides its worth. Great pop songs played well - rare enough at any time, a treasure all the time.

Jason Ankeny from AllMusic said "The two-disc, 36-track complete anthology paints a definitive portrait of the Sports' career; split between singles and album tracks (compiled on the first disc) and rare and unreleased material (found on the second), the set is a solid introduction to the work of a sadly underrecognized group, a kind of Australian counterpart to the music of Elvis Costello, Graham Parker or Joe Jackson."

An Amazon reviewer said "This definitive collection features 2CDs each containing the quintessential The Sports tunes including "Who Listens to the Radio", "Don't Throw Stones" and "Strangers on a Train".

Track listing

References

The Sports albums
Mushroom Records compilation albums
1997 greatest hits albums
Compilation albums by Australian artists